Loch Long is a sea loch situated on the western coast of Scotland, in the Highlands.  It is a popular destination for tourists and fishers.

The nearby Eilean Donan Castle stands at the confluence of Loch Long, Loch Duich and Loch Alsh.

Loch Long, Loch Duich and Loch Alsh were together designated as a Nature Conservation Marine Protected Area in 2014. The designation is in place to protect the lochs' burrowed mud and their flame shell beds.

References

Sea lochs of Scotland
Lochs of Highland (council area)
Nature Conservation Marine Protected Areas of Scotland